is a railway station on two lines of the Osaka Metro in Chūō-ku, Osaka, Japan.

Lines
Sakaisuji-Hommachi Station is served by the following two Osaka Metro lines:
 (K15)
 (C17)

Layout
The station has two side platforms serving two tracks for the Sakaisuji Line on the second basement, between the third and fourth buildings of Semba Center Building, and an island platform serving two tracks for the Chuo Line under the Sakaisuji Line. The platform for the Chuo Line is about 40 m wide because it is located under the second basement floor of Semba Center Building.

"Semba-higashi (船場東)" has been shown on the station signs since October 2011 to revive the traditional "Semba Brand" in the center of the city of Osaka. "Semba-nishi (船場西)" is shown on the station signs at adjacent Hommachi Station.

Sakaisuji Line platforms

Chūō Line platforms

History
The station opened on 6 December 1969.

Surrounding area
Chuo Ward Office
Osaka Prefectural Police Higashi Police Station
Teijin
Marubeni
Semba Center Building
Mydome Osaka
The Osaka Chamber of Commerce and Industry
Hanshin Expressway Route 1 Loop Line
Hanshin Expressway Route 13 Higashi-Osaka Line

External links

 Sakaisuji-Hommachi Station - Sakaisuji Line from Osaka Metro website 
 Sakaisuji-Hommachi Station - Sakaisuji Line from Osaka Metro website 
 Sakaisuji-Hommachi Station - Chūō Line from Osaka Metro website 
 Sakaisuji-Hommachi Station - Chūō Line from Osaka Metro website 

Chūō-ku, Osaka
Railway stations in Osaka
Railway stations in Japan opened in 1969
Osaka Metro stations